Economics and the Public Purpose is a 1973 book by Harvard economist John Kenneth Galbraith. Galbraith advocates a "new socialism" as the solution, nationalising military production and public services such as health care. He also advocates introducing disciplined wage, salary, profit and price controls on the economy to reduce inequality and restrain the power of giant corporations. Socialisation of the "unduly weak industries and unduly strong ones" together with planning for the remainder would allow the public interest to be accorded its rightful preference, argues Galbraith, over private interests. He adds that this can only be achieved when there is a new belief system that rejects the orthodoxy of economics in the past. The new socialism needs to be achieved through gradual democratic political change.

See also 
 History of economic thought
 Social democracy
 Democratic socialism
 Liberal socialism

1973 non-fiction books
1973 in economics
Books by John Kenneth Galbraith
Houghton Mifflin books